Kujula Kadphises (Kushan language: Κοζουλου Καδφιζου, also Κοζολα Καδαφες; Kharosthi: 𐨐𐨂𐨗𐨂𐨫 𐨐𐨯, IAST: , ; Ancient Chinese: 丘就卻, Qiujiuque; reigned 30–80 CE, or 40-90 CE according to Bopearachchi) was a Kushan prince who united the Yuezhi confederation in Bactria during the 1st century CE, and became the first Kushan emperor. According to the Rabatak inscription, he was the great grandfather of the great Kushan king Kanishka I. He is considered the founder of the Kushan Empire.

History
The origins of Kujula Kadphises are quite obscure, and he is usually believed to be a descendant of the Kushan ruler Heraios, or possibly identical with him. However, Kujula shares his name (Kushan: Κοζουλου on some of his "Hermaeus" coins, or Κοζολα on his "Augustus" coins) with some of the last Indo-Scythian rulers, such as Liaka Kusulaka (Greek: Λιακα Κοζουλο), or his son Patika Kusulaka, which might suggest some family connection.

Chinese accounts

In the process of their expansion eastward, Kujula Kadphises and his son Vima Takto (or Vema Tahktu) seem to have displaced the Indo-Parthian kingdom, established in northwestern India by the Parthian Gondophares since around 20 CE: His son, Yangaozhen [probably Vema Tahktu or, possibly, his brother Sadaṣkaṇa], became king in his place. He defeated Tianzhu [North-western India] and installed Generals to supervise and lead it. The Yuezhi then became extremely rich. All the kingdoms call [their king] the Guishuang [Kushan] king, but the Han call them by their original name, Da Yuezhi [Great Yuezhi]. The invasion of the Indo-Parthian kingdom led by Kujula Kadphises is thought to have occurred some time after 45 CE, during the reign of Gondophares's successors: Abdagases and Sases.

Genealogy according to the Rabatak inscription
The connection of Kujula with other Kushan rulers is described in the Rabatak inscription, discovered in Rabatak in what was once Bactria in 1993, which was inscribed by Kanishka. Kanishka states Kujula Kadphises to be his great-grandfather, Vima Taktu to be his grandfather, Vima Kadphises to be his father, and himself Kanishka:

And he [Kanishka] gave orders to make images of the same, (namely) of these gods who are written herein, and he gave orders to make (them) for these kings: for King Kujula Kadphises (his) great grandfather, and for King Vima Taktu (his) grandfather, and for King Vima Kadphises (his) father, and for himself, King Kanishka.

Khalchayan
Some of the statues of the Khalchayan palatial site in Bactria, dated circa 50 CE, probably corresponded to the rule of Kujula Kadphises.

Coinage
The coinage of the Kushan ruler, Kujula Kadphises, shows us the enlargement of the religious horizon of the Kushans. His first issue, which has the debased portrait and name of Hermaeus on the obverse, shows Heracles on the reverse, still following the Greek tradition, even though Heracles may be the Interpretatio graeca of the Iranian god Verethragna, contrary to earlier assumptions, which regarded Kujula Kadphises as Buddhist on the basis of the epithet.

References

Bibliography
 "Catalogue of coins in the Panjab Museum, Lahore. Vol. I Indo-Greek coins", Whitehead, Argonaut Inc. Publishers, Chicago.
 
 Hill, John E. 2004. The Western Regions according to the Hou Hanshu. Draft annotated English translation.

External links
 Catalogue of coins of Kujula Kadphises

Kushan emperors
80 deaths
1st-century monarchs in Asia
Year of birth unknown